__notoc__

Linguistic philosophy is the view that many or all philosophical problems can be solved (or dissolved) by paying closer attention to language, either by reforming language or by better understanding our everyday language. The former position is that of ideal language philosophy, one prominent example being logical atomism. The latter is the view defended in ordinary language philosophy.

See also

 
 Formal semantics (natural language)
 Linguistic turn
 Philosophical language

Notes

References

 Richard Rorty, 1967. Introduction: Metaphilosophical difficulties of linguistic philosophy. In Richard Rorty (ed.). The Linguistic Turn: Recent Essays in Philosophical Method. The University of Chicago Press, Chicago and London, 1967.

External links
 Entry on analytic philosophy in the Internet Encyclopedia of Philosophy

Philosophical methodology
Philosophy of language
Linguistic turn

pt:Filosofia linguística